Michael P. McCoy (born April 1, 1972) is an American football coach and former player who is the quarterbacks coach for the Jacksonville Jaguars of the National Football League (NFL). He has previously spent time as quarterbacks coach for the Carolina Panthers, the offensive coordinator of the Denver Broncos and Arizona Cardinals, and four seasons as head coach of the San Diego Chargers.

Playing career
After graduating from San Marin High School in Novato, California, McCoy attended California State University, Long Beach, where he redshirted his first year. During his redshirt freshman season in 1991, McCoy played in eight games for the Long Beach State 49ers, starting five of them. He completed 87 of 165 passes for 938 yards, seven touchdowns and three interceptions. When Long Beach State discontinued its football program in December 1991, McCoy transferred to the University of Utah. In his first season with the Utes, he served primarily as the backup to senior Frank Dolce. He saw action in six games, starting two contests while Dolce was injured. He continued as the starter for the 1993 and 1994 seasons, with career totals at Utah of 7,404 yards passing, 49 TD, 23 Int, completing 63.7% for a rating of 146.1.

His collegiate career ended in dramatic fashion in 1994 when he threw a game-winning, 5-yard touchdown pass to wide receiver Kevin Dyson in the final minute to give Utah a 16–13 win over Arizona in the Freedom Bowl. He led the Utes to a season ending top ten national ranking. 

After he wasn't selected in the 1995 NFL Draft, McCoy signed with the Denver Broncos as a rookie free agent, but was cut during the preseason. In November that year, the Green Bay Packers signed him to their practice squad following injuries to Brett Favre and his backup Ty Detmer. McCoy also had stints with the Amsterdam Admirals, San Francisco 49ers, Philadelphia Eagles and Seattle Seahawks. McCoy played two years in the CFL with the Calgary Stampeders behind Dave Dickenson.

Coaching career

Carolina Panthers
From 2000 to 2008, McCoy served on the Carolina Panthers coaching staff, appearing in Super Bowl XXXVIII with the Panthers.

Denver Broncos

After the 2008 season, Mike McCoy was hired to be the new offensive coordinator and quarterbacks coach of the Denver Broncos. In 2009, then-Broncos QB Kyle Orton enjoyed a career year under McCoy, posting career highs in virtually every passing category. The following year, the Broncos passing attack ranked seventh in the NFL, and Orton ranked fourth in the league in passing yards per game. McCoy revamped the Broncos offense in 2011 to accommodate Tim Tebow's skill-set, and the Broncos led the NFL in rushing.

On December 31, 2012, Chicago Bears head coach Lovie Smith was fired, and the Bears asked the Broncos for permission to interview McCoy for the head coach position.

In addition to the Bears, the Arizona Cardinals, Buffalo Bills, San Diego Chargers, and Philadelphia Eagles also asked and were granted permission to interview McCoy for their vacant head coaching positions during the Broncos' playoff bye week. When asked about McCoy being a hot head coaching candidate, Denver head coach John Fox responded, "he’s a heck-of-a coach."

San Diego Chargers
On January 15, 2013, McCoy became the head coach of the San Diego Chargers, succeeding Norv Turner. McCoy was the youngest active head coach in the NFL and the second-youngest in team history; Al Saunders was 39 years old when he became head coach in 1986. He earned his first win as a head coach on September 15, 2013, against Chip Kelly and the Philadelphia Eagles.

Starting the season with a paltry 4–6 record, the Chargers won 5 of their last 6 games – winning 4 straight to end the season – and finished the regular season with a 9–7 record. McCoy led the Chargers to a playoff berth as the AFC's 6th seed. The Chargers had not made the playoffs since 2009. McCoy's Chargers upset the Cincinnati Bengals to a 27–10 victory in the Wild Card round. This was the Chargers' first playoff victory since 2008. The Chargers' win streak would end in the next round of the playoffs with a 24–17 loss to the eventual AFC Champion Denver Broncos.

Despite their success in 2013, the Chargers went 9–7, 4–12 and 5–11 in the next three seasons. McCoy was fired on January 1, 2017 after their 37–27 loss to the Kansas City Chiefs. McCoy ended his Chargers tenure with a 28–38 record. A little over two weeks later, the Chargers announced their intention to move to Los Angeles after 56 years in San Diego, making McCoy the last person to coach a professional football team in the city until Mike Martz coached the San Diego Fleet of the Alliance of American Football in 2019. To date, he is the last person to coach an NFL team in the city.

Return to Denver
On January 13, 2017, McCoy was named the offensive coordinator of the Denver Broncos. He was fired after a six-game losing streak on November 20, 2017.

Arizona Cardinals
On January 25, 2018, McCoy was hired by the Arizona Cardinals as the offensive coordinator, replacing Harold Goodwin. On October 19, 2018, McCoy was fired after offensive struggles with the team and was replaced by Byron Leftwich.

Jacksonville Jaguars
On February 7, 2022, McCoy was hired by the Jacksonville Jaguars to serve as the team's quarterbacks coach for the 2022 season.

Head coaching record

Personal life
A native of Novato, California, McCoy and his wife Kellie have two children, a daughter and a son, Olivia and Luke.

References

External links
 Jacksonville Jaguars profile
 Just Sports Stats

1972 births
Living people
American football quarterbacks
American players of Canadian football
Amsterdam Admirals players
Arizona Cardinals coaches
Calgary Stampeders players
Canadian football quarterbacks
Carolina Panthers coaches
Denver Broncos coaches
Denver Broncos players
Green Bay Packers players
 Jacksonville Jaguars coaches
Long Beach State 49ers football players
National Football League offensive coordinators
People from Novato, California
Philadelphia Eagles players
Players of American football from California
San Francisco 49ers players
Seattle Seahawks players
Sportspeople from the San Francisco Bay Area
Utah Utes football players
San Diego Chargers head coaches